Kevin McClelland (born July 4, 1962) is a Canadian former professional ice hockey player. He was recently the head coach of the Wichita Thunder in the ECHL.

Playing career
As a youth, McClelland played in the 1975 Quebec International Pee-Wee Hockey Tournament with a minor ice hockey team from Oshawa.

McClelland was drafted in the fourth round, 71st overall, by the Hartford Whalers during the 1980 NHL Entry Draft. The majority of his NHL career was served playing center ice with the Edmonton Oilers (1984–1989), with whom he won four Stanley Cups 1984-85-87-88. His most memorable playoff moment came in Game 1 of the 1984 Stanley Cup Finals when he scored the game's only goal in a 1-0 win over the New York Islanders. McClelland retired from the NHL following 588 games, recording a total of 68 goals, 112 assists, 180 points, and 1672 penalty minutes.

Career statistics

Regular season and playoffs

Coaching career
He served as the head coach of the Central Hockey League's Mississippi RiverKings for three years until he resigned on June 11, 2008. He also was the head coach of the Colorado Eagles of the Central Hockey League from 2008 to 2010. On April 26, 2010, McClelland was introduced as the head coach of the Wichita Thunder of the Central Hockey League. He would serve as head coach of the Thunder through their transition to the ECHL but after the 2015–16 season, in which the team finished last in the league, his contract would not be renewed.

Coaching statistics

Awards and achievements
1983–84 - NHL - Stanley Cup (Edmonton)
1984–85 - NHL - Stanley Cup (Edmonton)
1986–87 - NHL - Stanley Cup (Edmonton)
1987–88 - NHL - Stanley Cup (Edmonton)

Transactions
 June 11, 1980 - Drafted by the Hartford Whalers in the fourth round, 71st overall.
 June 29, 1981 - Traded from Hartford Whalers with Pat Boutette to Pittsburgh Penguins for compensation for signing Greg Millen.
 November 2, 1989 - Traded from Edmonton Oilers with Jimmy Carson and round 5 pick in the 1991 draft to Detroit Red Wings for Adam Graves, Petr Klima, Joe Murphy and Jeff Sharples.
 August 12, 1993 Traded from Toronto Maple Leafs to Winnipeg Jets for cash.

References

External links

1962 births
Living people
Adirondack Red Wings players
Baltimore Skipjacks players
Canadian ice hockey forwards
Detroit Red Wings players
Edmonton Oilers players
Hartford Whalers draft picks
Ice hockey people from Ontario
Moncton Hawks players
Niagara Falls Flyers players
Pittsburgh Penguins players
Prince Albert Raiders coaches
Rochester Americans players
St. John's Maple Leafs players
Sportspeople from Oshawa
Stanley Cup champions
Toronto Maple Leafs players
Winnipeg Jets (1979–1996) players
Wichita Thunder coaches
Canadian ice hockey coaches